Ferahşad Hatun ( "Happiness", also known as  Muhtereme Hatun ("Honorable, respectful"), was a consort of Sultan Bayezid II of the Ottoman Empire.

Life
Ferahşad entered in Bayezid's harem in 1484, and gave birth to Şehzade Mehmed on 1486. Contemporary historian Kemalpaşazade commented on his birth, by stating that he was a "substitute" (bedel) for his recently deceased half-brother, Şehzade Abdullah.

According to Turkish tradition, all princes were expected to work as provincial governors as a part of their training. Mehmed was sent to Kefe in 1490, and Ferahşad accompanied him.

Following Mehmed's death in December 1504, she retired to Bursa. In retirement she made endowments in Silivri, and Istanbul. She was buried in Muradiye Complex, Bursa.

Issue
Together with Bayezid, Ferahşad had one son:
 Şehzade Mehmed (1486 - December 1504, buried in Muradiye Complex). He was married to a princess of the Giray khanate of Crimea, Ayşe Hatun (who would later be consort of his half-brother Selim I) and had two children by an unknown mother, Fatma Sultan (1500 - 1566) and Şehzade Mehmed (1505, posthumously - 1513, killed by Selim I).

References

External links
Biography of Muhtereme Hatun in Turkish

Muhtereme
16th-century consorts of Ottoman sultans